Lowell is a city in Kent County of the U.S. state of Michigan. The population was 3,783 at the 2010 census.

The city is mostly surrounded by Lowell Township to the south, but the two are administered autonomously. Lowell is situated just north of where the Flat River meets the Grand River. The city's downtown area is listed on the National Register of Historic Places as the Downtown Lowell Historic District.

History
The earliest modern residents of the Flat River and Grand River were the Grand River Odawa, who established several villages along the Grand River. In the first decades of the 19th century, the village was led by Wabiwindego and Keewaycooshcum, and later by Cobmoosa. In the 1830s, Cobmoosa purchased the land under the Odawa village in the name of his father, fur trader Antoine Campau. The Odawa remained at their village on the Flat River until 1858, when they moved to a reservation at Manistee, Michigan.

The modern city of Lowell was founded in 1831 by Daniel Marsac as a trading post with this existing Odawa village, built on the south bank of the Grand River.  During the first years of his trading post, Marsac lived with the Grand River Odawa leader Wabiwindego.  In 1847, he purchased land on the north side of the river and platted it as "Dansville". In 1851, a post office was established there named "Lowell" after the township.  The community was replatted in 1854 and renamed after the post office. It incorporated as a village in 1861.

Geography

Lowell is the home of the North Country Trail Association. In the Lowell area, the trail runs just north of downtown and along portions of the Flat River.

Major highways
 runs east and west though the center of the community.

Climate
This climatic region is typified by large seasonal temperature differences, with warm to hot (and often humid) summers and cold (sometimes severely cold) winters.  According to the Köppen Climate Classification system, Lowell has a humid continental climate, abbreviated "Dfb" on climate maps.

Demographics

2010 census
As of the census of 2010, there were 3,783 people, 1,457 households, and 962 families living in the city. The racial makeup of the city was 94.1% White, 1.3% African American, 0.6% Native American, 0.6% Asian, 1.1% from other races, and 2.3% from two or more races. Hispanic or Latino of any race were 3.0% of the population.

There were 1,457 households, of which 36.4% had children under the age of 18 living with them, 45.8% were married couples living together, 15.5% had a female householder with no husband present, 4.7% had a male householder with no wife present, and 34.0% were non-families. 29.0% of all households were made up of individuals, and 10.2% had someone living alone who was 65 years of age or older. The average household size was 2.50 and the average family size was 3.04.

The median age in the city was 37.1 years. 25.7% of residents were under the age of 18; 8.9% were between the ages of 18 and 24; 25.1% were from 25 to 44; 25.2% were from 45 to 64; and 15% were 65 years of age or older. The gender makeup of the city was 46.3% male and 53.7% female.

2000 census
As of the census of 2000, there were 4,013 people, 1,492 households, and 1,008 families living in the city. The racial makeup of the city was 96.21% White, 0.57% African American, 0.62% Native American, 0.42% Asian, 0.12% Pacific Islander, 0.72% from other races, and 1.32% from two or more races. Hispanic or Latino of any race were 2.14% of the population.

There were 1,492 households, out of which 38.7% had children under the age of 18 living with them, 49.1% were married couples living together, 14.0% had a female householder with no husband present, and 32.4% were non-families. 26.7% of all households were made up of individuals, and 10.9% had someone living alone who was 65 years of age or older.  The average household size was 2.59 and the average family size was 3.17.

In the city, the population was spread out, with 29.3% under the age of 18, 8.5% from 18 to 24, 30.8% from 25 to 44, 17.6% from 45 to 64, and 13.8% who were 65 years of age or older.  The median age was 34 years. For every 100 females, there were 89.0 males.  For every 100 females age 18 and over, there were 85.8 males.

The median income for a household in the city was $42,326, and the median income for a family was $49,145. Males had a median income of $36,525 versus $25,625 for females. The per capita income for the city was $17,843.  About 4.4% of families and 6.0% of the population were below the poverty line, including 5.3% of those under age 18 and 7.5% of those age 65 or over.

Recreation

Education
Lowell Area Schools is the local school district. Bushnell and Cherry Creek elementary schools serve the city itself. Lowell Middle School and Lowell High School serve the entire school district.

Notable people 
 William Seward Burroughs I, adding machine inventor, founder of the Burroughs Corporation and grandfather of Beat Generation author William S. Burroughs lived in Lowell in the 1860s and graduated from Lowell High School.
 Cobmoosa, operated a trading post where Lowell exists now.
 Mike Dumas, professional football player (retired)
 Mabel Gillespie, farmer, teacher, journalist, politician, lived in Lowell from 1958 to 1967.
 Ernest R. Graham, designer of Chicago landmarks such as the Wrigley Building, Shedd Aquarium, etc., born in Lowell.
 Jennie Harris Oliver, poet, born in Lowell.
 Dave Hildenbrand, Michigan politician
 Anthony Kiedis, Red Hot Chili Peppers lead singer.
 Howard Henry Peckham, professor and historian, Lowell High School graduate.
 Ann Rule, author of true crime novels, born in Lowell, Michigan
 John Addison Scott, U.S. Navy Rear Admiral and Navy Cross recipient.
 Glendon Swarthout, novelist, graduated from Lowell High School.
 Daniel Vosovic, fashion designer, Lowell High School graduate.

References

External links

City of Lowell official website
Lowell Area Chamber of Commerce
Lowell Area Schools
Lowell Community Wellness

Cities in Kent County, Michigan
Grand Rapids metropolitan area
Populated places established in 1831
1831 establishments in Michigan Territory